Charles Abraham may refer to:
 Charles Abraham (bishop of Wellington) (1814–1903), English Anglican bishop, in Wellington then Lichfield
 Charles Abraham (bishop of Derby) (1857–1945), English Anglican bishop, in Derby; son of the above

See also
Charles Abrahams (1838–1893), Danish architect